Just Peck  is a 2009 American comedy film directed by Michael A. Nickles and written by Marc Arneson.

Plot
A skinny high school sophomore dreams up a science project that will make him a living legend, and win him the heart of a pretty senior who sees his true potential. Michael Peck is the kid nobody sees while he's walking down the hall. But when popular senior Emily takes a liking to Michael, he starts to become a little less invisible. Meanwhile, Michael's well meaning yet misguided parents pressure him to enter the upcoming science fair - an event that could land him right back in the land of misfits. With his newfound popularity hanging precariously in the balance, the smart and stealthy teen dreams up a science project that will turn heads, and teach his parents a valuable lesson.

Cast
 Keir Gilchrist as Michael Peck
 Brie Larson as Emily Donaldson
 Marcia Cross as Cheryl Peck
 Adam Arkin as Mike Peck
 Camryn Manheim as Principal Wood
 Kyle Kaplan as Geiger
 Tiya Sircar as Becca
 Hayley Holmes as Annie
 Serena Berman as Sage

Release
Arneson has written the screenplay when he was a student at UCLA.

The film was picked up by American World Pictures and premiered at the 2009 Cannes Film Festival.

References

External links
 
 

2009 films
American teen comedy films
American coming-of-age comedy films
Films shot in California
Films shot in Northern Ireland
American independent films
2000s teen comedy films
2009 comedy films
2000s English-language films
2000s American films